is a 1987 arcade game developed and published by Taito. The arcade version was licensed to Romstar for North American manufacturing and distribution. The game is subtitled "The Story of Bubble Bobble 2" and is the sequel to Taito's hit game Bubble Bobble from the previous year. It is the second of four arcade games in the Bubble Bobble series (followed by Bubble Symphony and Bubble Memories, but itself has two direct sequels: Parasol Stars and Bubble Bobble Part 2). The game was ported for numerous home computers and game consoles.

The main characters are Bubblun and Bobblun, the protagonists of Bubble Bobble (known as "Bub and Bob" in the western releases). However, in this game they appear in their human forms as "Bubby" and "Bobby", as opposed to the "bubble dragons" of the first game (following on from the first game's true ending). Also unlike the first game, players must now "alternate" (i.e., take turns), with player one as Bubby (green shirt), and player 2 as Bobby (blue shirt) (the same color scheme as in the first game).

Gameplay 

Following the events of Bubble Bobble, Bubby and Bobby set out to defeat the "Dark Shadow" and rescue the Rainbow Islands. The Dark Shadow is the entity responsible for the events in Bubble Bobble. The game is set on a chain of ten islands, each one with a different theme. Each island provides four rounds of game-play, and once these are complete the player moves to the next island in the chain. In each round the player must get to the top before the sea level rises and kills them. The islands get progressively more difficult, with enemies moving much faster on the later ones. These are depicted on a map screen before the start of each island.

Players can release rainbows that act as weapons, makeshift platforms, and item collectors. Slinging rainbows damages any enemies and acquires any items that the rainbows come in contact with. When jumped upon, they fall down, beating any enemies below them, and releasing a damage field above them. Collecting power-ups increases the player's speed, the speed of the rainbows and how many are spawned. If players take too long in a level, water will start to rise up from the bottom of the stage, and will kill the player character if it rises above his head.

Like Bubble Bobble before it, the game has multiple endings. To get the "True and Happy" ending the player must find and complete the three secret islands (although most consumer versions of the game completely lack the secret islands because of budget constraints). These islands are not visible until all 7 big diamonds are collected. To get a big diamond, the player must collect seven different-colored small diamonds on the island and finish the round. The small diamonds are found by destroying enemies by dropping a rainbow on them from above or destroying them with various special items. After collecting the small diamonds, a word "NICE" appears. If the small diamonds are collected in the correct order, the player will get to a secret room at the end of each island, which contains a permanent power up. The color of the small diamonds depends on where the fallen enemies land, so the player can somewhat determine which diamond colors will drop.

The scoring system also has secrets, which allow vastly higher scores to be achieved than normal.

Extra version 
Rainbow Islands Extra Version is a modified version of Rainbow Islands; the game is exactly the same except the stages' enemies and bosses appear in a different order (much like Bubble Bobble'''s Super Mode). Rainbow Islands Extra was released in limited quantities in the arcade. The game was also included as a mode in the Sega Mega Drive version of Rainbow Islands.

 Ports 

 "Over the Rainbow" theme 

The original arcade game contained in-game music reminiscent of the song "Over the Rainbow" from The Wizard of Oz. This song was included in the Japanese Mega Drive, PC Engine CD and Famicom releases of the game, as well at the Ocean Software home Computer ports (Amstrad CPC, ZX Spectrum, Commodore 64, Amiga and Atari ST).

However, in later console versions of the game (Master System, NES, Saturn, PS1, and the Japanese Taito Memories and international Taito Legends collections), aside from part of the chorus, the in-game music was changed so as not to infringe copyright. The hidden eight level of the NES version, as well as the Game Boy Color version, simply use the Bubble Bobble theme music.

 Reception 

In Japan, Game Machine listed Rainbow Island: The Story of Bubble Bobble 2 on their December 1, 1987 issue as being the second most-successful table arcade unit of the month. It went on to become one of the top ten highest-grossing arcade games of 1988 in Japan. The Spectrum version of the game was number-one on the UK sales chart from May to June 1990 at the time of release. It was re-released at a budget price, and was number 1 again from October 1992 to March 1993. It was also the top-selling Amiga budget title in March 1992.

UK magazine C&VG gave the ST version a score of 93%, praising the graphics and calling the game addictive and "tremendous fun". It was awarded 94% in the April 1990 issue of Your Sinclair and was placed at number 8 in the "Your Sinclair official top 100". In issue 93 of the same magazine, the readers voted it the 2nd best game of all time. It was also awarded 94% score in Crash. The readers of Crash voted Rainbow Islands the #1 game of all time in December 1991. MegaTech magazine said it was "virtually arcade perfect, with only flickery sprites letting the side down".Edge stated in 1994 that, "Taito's Rainbow Islands has all the ingredients for a superb videogame – incentives, copious rewards and bonuses, and intelligent bosses".

Despite these accomplishments, in his review of the Bubble Bobble Featuring Rainbow Islands pack, Rich Leadbetter of Sega Saturn Magazine said Rainbow Islands was "vastly underrated and over-looked". He added that the gameplay still felt fresh and unique despite the passage of years, and was good enough to make the collection a must-have by itself.

Accolades

The Amiga version of Rainbow Islands was the first game to make #1 on Amiga Power's annual All Time Top 100 list in 1991, and again in 1992. It held the spot for years until losing to Sensible Soccer, which retained the title for the rest of the magazine's run. The Mega Drive version was the 9th best game of all time, according to Mega magazine's "Mega Top 100 Carts" in 1992.  In 1996, GamesMaster ranked the game 79th on their "Top 100 Games of All Time."

 Format conversion 
In 1989 Graftgold were invited to convert the game to five home computer formats: Commodore 64, ZX Spectrum, Amstrad CPC, Atari ST and Commodore Amiga. Telecomsoft had bought the conversion rights in the UK. At that time Graftgold consisted of seven people and they were working from an office above a fruit and veg store, with very uneven floors and an iron staircase for access.

They agreed to do the conversion for a fixed sum and based on getting the arcade machine and source graphics and documentation from Taito. The job they reckoned would take nine months and milestones were assigned based on their knowledge of the game and that it showed seven islands on the start screen.

The main problem was that they were on the first floor and an iron staircase for access at the back and they had to get the arcade machine upstairs. It took all of them dragging the cabinet up the stairs rather slowly. The cabinet was made of 3/4" chipboard and contained all of the workings of an old CRT TV and more. The JAMMA board was also the size of a PC motherboard.

The game took the whole team. John Cumming took charge of the maps and graphics. Gary Foreman did the C64 version. David O'Connor did the ZX Spectrum and Amstrad CPC versions. Jason Page did the 16-bit and C64 sounds. Steve Turner did the management and the Z80 8-bit sounds. Dominic Robinson did the technical design and support. Andrew Braybrook did the 16-bit versions.

 Regional differences 
The European version of the Sega Master System port contains a bad glitch that crashes the game after Level 7, sending the player back to the title screen. If the level select code is used to access Level 8, the same glitch occurs at the end of that level completely preventing the player from seeing the ending. The Brazilian version has fixed this glitch.

The European version of the NES port, developed by Ocean, is more faithful to the Arcade version, whereas the Japanese and North American versions have original level designs and story intermissions.

 Soundtrack 

The Songs of arcade Rainbow Island'' was contained in the CD titled  on June 21, 1988, in Japan.

References

External links 

1987 video games
Amiga games
Amstrad CPC games
Arcade video games
Atari ST games
Bubble Bobble
Commodore 64 games
Game Boy Color games
Game Boy games
Golden Joystick Award winners
FM Towns games
Mobile games
Nintendo Entertainment System games
Ocean Software games
Platform games
PlayStation (console) games
Master System games
Sega Genesis games
Sega Saturn games
Square Enix franchises
Taito arcade games
TurboGrafx-CD games
Video game sequels
Video games scored by Hisayoshi Ogura
Video games scored by Masahiko Takaki
Video games set on fictional islands
WonderSwan games
ZX Spectrum games
Video games developed in Japan
Graftgold games